Gueux can mean different things:

 Les Gueux ("The Beggars") and les Gueux de mer ("Sea Beggars"), name taken on during the Eighty Years' War by the Dutch rebels against Spain.
 Claude Gueux, short story by Victor Hugo
 Reims-Gueux - a French racing circuit
 Gueux, a commune of the Marne département, in France
 Gueuze, a style of beer